The Samuel Sanchez House, on the Sanchez Ranch near Los Brazos, New Mexico, was built in the 1880s.  Now located off U.S. Route 64, it was listed on the National Register of Historic Places in 1986.

It was built in Folk Territorial Style.  It is a stucco over adobe building, with a wood shingle roof and brickwork chimneys.  It has lathed porch posts and engaged columns with brackets.

See also
Samuel Sanchez Barns

References

National Register of Historic Places in Rio Arriba County, New Mexico
Residential buildings completed in 1885